Holophaga foetida is a bacterium, the type species of its genus. It is a homoacetogenic bacterium degrading methoxylated aromatic compounds. It is gram-negative, obligately anaerobic and rod-shaped, with type strain TMBS4 (DSM 6591). Its genome has been sequenced. It is known for its ability to anaerobically degrade aromatic compounds and the production of volatile sulfur compounds through a unique pathway.

References

Further reading

External links
LPSN

Type strain of Holophaga foetida at BacDive -  the Bacterial Diversity Metadatabase

Acidobacteriota
Bacteria described in 1995